This is a list of United States national Golden Gloves champions in the heavyweight division, along with the state or region they represented. In 2000, the heavyweight limit was raised to 201 lb, with super heavyweights competing above that.

1928: Walter Radka – Chicago
1929: George Meyer – Chicago
1930: Grant Fortney – Chicago
1931: John Long – Gary
1932: Adam Smith – Rockford
1933: John Pecek – Chicago
1934: Otis Thomas – Chicago
1935: Lorenzo Peck – Detroit
1936: Paul Hartnek – Omaha
1937: Paul Hartnek – Omaha
1938: Dan Meritt – Cleveland
1939: Tony Novak – Kansas City
1940: Cornelius Young – Chicago
1941: Allen Aubrey – Cleveland
1942: Hubert Hood – Chicago
1943: Walter Moore – Chicago
1944: Orland Ott – Fort Worth
1945: Luke Baylark – Chicago
1946: Joe Frucci – Gary
1947: Richard Hagan – Chicago
1948: Clarence Henry – Los Angeles
1949: Don Perko – Denver
1950: Earl Sudduth – Rockford
1951: Ernest Fann – Cleveland
1952: Ed Sanders – Los Angeles
1953: Sonny Liston – St. Louis
1954: Garvin Sawyer – Cincinnati
1955: Eddie Catoe – Kansas City
1956: Solomon McTier – Montgomery
1957: Joe Hemphel – Rockford
1958: Dan Hodge – Wichita
1959: Jimmy Jones – Chicago
1960: Cassius Clay – Louisville
1961: Al Jenkins – Green Bay
1962: Bennie Black – Chicago
1963: Harley Cooper – Omaha
1964: Wyce Westbrook – Cincinnati
1965: Jerry Quarry – Los Angeles
1966: Clay Hodges – Los Angeles
1967: Clay Hodges – Los Angeles
1968: Albert Wilson – Charlotte
1969: Walter Moore – Los Angeles
1970: William Thompson – Chicago
1971: Ronald Draper – Kansas City
1972: Duane Bobick – Minneapolis
1973: Johnny Hudson – Detroit
1974: Emory Chapman – Las Vegas
1975: Emory Chapman – Las Vegas
1976: Michael Dokes – Cleveland
1977: James Clark – Pennsylvania
1978: Greg Page – Louisville
1979: Marvis Frazier – Pennsylvania
1980: Michael Arms – Milwaukee
1981: Joe Thomas – Pennsylvania
1982: Earl Lewis – Cleveland
1983: Olian Alexander – Kansas
1984: Mike Tyson – New York
1985: Jerry Goff  – Jackson
1986: Orlin Norris – Fort Worth
1987: Dave Sherbrooke – Upper Midwest
1988: Derek Isaman – Huntington
1989: Boris Powell – St. Louis
1990: Gregory Suttington – Kansas City
1991: Melvin Foster – Washington, DC
1992: Robert Summers – Chicago
1993: Fres Oquendo – Chicago
1994: Nate Jones – Chicago
1995: Nate Jones – Illinois
1996: DaVarryl Williamson – Milwaukee
1997: Jeremiah Muhammad – Mid-South
1998: Calvin Brock – Knoxville
1999: DaVarryl Williamson – Colorado
2000: Devin Vargas – Toledo
2001: Devin Vargas – Toledo
2002: Matthew Godfrey – New England
2003: Blake E. Cruz- Colorado
2004: Chazz Witherspoon – Pennsylvania
2005: Eric Fields – Mid-South
2006: Eric Fields – Oklahoma
2007: Deontay Wilder – Knoxville
2008: Craig Lewis (SP) – Cincinnati, OH
2009: Jordan Shimmell – Hudsonville, MI
2010: Steve Geffrard - Boca Raton, FL 
2011: Denzel Jefferson (SP) – Richmond, Va
2012: Joseph Mack Williams – Queens, New York
2013: Earl Newman (SP) – Brooklyn, New York
2014: DeRae Crane – Houston
2015: Mike Hilton – New Jersey
2016: Jakob Rose – Tucson, Arizona 
2017: Cam F. Awesome – Kansas City
2018: Darius Fulghum - Texas
2019: Den Tati Mackaya - Texas
2021: Jkhory Gibson - Texas

References

Golden Gloves